The 2003 Thailand Open was a men's tennis tournament played on indoor hard courts. It was the inaugural edition of the Thailand Open, and was part of the International Series of the 2003 ATP Tour. It took place at the Impact Arena in Bangkok, Thailand, from 22 September through 29 September 2003. Eight-seeded Taylor Dent won the singles title.

Finals

Singles

 Taylor Dent defeated  Juan Carlos Ferrero, 6–3, 7–6(7–5)
It was Dent's 2nd title of the year, and his 3rd overall.

Doubles

 Jonathan Erlich /  Andy Ram defeated  Andrew Kratzmann /  Jarkko Nieminen, 6–3, 7–6(7–4)
It was Jonathan Erlich's 1st title of the year, also 2nd overall. It was Andy Ram's 2nd title of the year and his 2nd overall. This marked the team's 1st title.

References

External links
Thailand Open on the official Association of Tennis Professionals website

 
 ATP Tour
 in tennis
Tennis, ATP Tour, Thailand Open
Tennis, ATP Tour, Thailand Open

Tennis, ATP Tour, Thailand Open